Pseudaspidimerus mauliki, is a species of lady beetle native to India, Sri Lanka, Bangladesh, Thailand, and Java.

Description
Body color with two forms; one form with reddish testaceous body with a pronotal black marking and three-spotted elytra. Second form with plain testaceous brown body without any markings. Prosternal carinae is subrectangular. and the carinae are sub-parallel.

References 

Coccinellidae
Insects of Sri Lanka
Beetles described in 1859